This is a partial list of booksellers in Boston, Massachusetts.

Booksellers in Boston

17th century

 John Allen
 William Avery
 Joseph Brunning (a.k.a. Joseph Browning), Court St.
 Nicholas Buttolph
 Duncan Campbell
 James Cowse
 John Dunton
 Benjamin Elliott, State St.
 John Foster
 Obadiah Gill
 John Griffin
 Benjamin Harris, Cornhill
 Vavasour Harris
 Elkanah Pembroke
 Michael Perry
 Samuel Phillips
 Edmund Ranger
 John Ratcliffe
 Samuel Sewall
 Andrew Thorncomb
 Hezekiah Usher
 John Usher
 James Wade
 Richard Wilkins

18th century
 John Amory
 Andrew Barclay (bookbinder)
 Ebenezer Battelle
 Nathaniel Belknap
 Caleb Blanchard, Dock Square
 Joshua Blanchard
 Nicholas Boone
 Nicholas Bowes
 John Boyles
 Cox & Berry
 Caleb Bingham
 John Boydell
 George Brownell
 Alford Butler
 Alford Butler Jr.
 John Campbell
 John Checkley
 James Foster Condy
 Jeremy Condy
 Cox & Berry; Edward Cox; Edward Berry
 T. Cox
 Michael Dennis
 John Edwards
 Joseph Edwards
 A. Ellison
 Benjamin Eliot
 John Eliot
 Samuel Eliot
 John Fleeming, 1760s-1770s
 John W. Folsom, Union St.
 Hopestill Foster
 Philip Freeman
 Richard Fry
 Samuel Gerrish
 Daniel Gookin
 Nathaniel Gookin
 Benjamin Gray
 William Gray
 Benjamin Guild, 1780s-1790s
 Thomas Hancock
 Charles Harrison
 Daniel Henchman, Cornhill
 John Hodgson
 William Lang
 John Langdon
 Samuel Kneeland
 Henry Knox; London Book-Store
 John Langdon
 Benjamin Larkin, Cornhill
 Ebenezer Larkin, Cornhill
 Thomas Leverett
 Bennet Love
 Walter MacAlpine
 William McAlpine
 John Mein; London Book-Store
 William Miller; Rivington & Miller, London Book-Store
 John Parker
 William Pelham (bookseller)
 John Pemberton
 John Perkins
 Joanna Perry, King St.
 Eleazer Phillips (a.k.a. Eleazar Phillips)
 Gillam Phillips
 John Phillips
 William Phillips
 Nathaniel Proctor
 Thomas Rand
 James Rivington; London Book-Store
 Samuel Robinson
 Ezekiel Russell
 Samuel Sewall, Jr.
 Francis Skinner
 Joseph Snelling
 William Spotswood
 Robert Starkey
 Samuel Webb
 David West
 John West
 Wharton & Bowes; John Wharton; Nicholas Bowes
 James White, Court St.
 Timothy White
 Joshua Winter

19th century
 Joseph F. Alsworth; Crosby & Alsworth
 Samuel T. Armstrong, Cornhill
 N.J. Bartlett
 William Blagrove; Boston Book Store
 Boston Chart and Nautical Bookstore, Custom House St.; Charles L. Blake; Robert A. Blake
 Leonard C. Bowles, Cornhill
 Osmyn Brewster; Crocker & Brewster
 George W. Briggs, Washington St.
 Oliver L. Briggs & Co.
 Brown, Taggard & Chase, Cornhill
 Joseph Bumstead, State St.
 James W. Burditt, Court St.
 Burnham & Brothers, Cornhill
 Thomas Burnham, Cornhill
 James Campbell, Tremont St.
 George Clark, Dock Sq.
 Otis Clapp, School St.; Beacon St.
 Daniel C. Colesworthy
 George W. Cottrell, Cornhill
 Crosby & Nichols, Washington St.
 William Crosby, Washington St.
 Cummings, Hilliard & Co., Cornhill
 Robert S. Davis, Washington St.; R.S. Davis & Co.; P. Stearns Davis.
 William H. Dennet, Washington St.
 Oliver Ditson
 Patrick Donahoe, Franklin St.
 Estes and Lauriat
 Oliver Everett, Cornhill
 Charles Ewer, Cornhill
 Federhen & Co.; Charles Thacher
 William Pembroke Fetridge
 Fields, Osgood & Company
 William B. Fowle, Cornhill
 Patrick Kevin Foley (a.k.a. P.K. Foley), Bromfield St.
 James French, Washington St.
 Richard L. Frye
 Horace B. Fuller
 M.H. Gaughan
 Edwin H. Gill
 Charles Goodspeed, Park Street
 Charles D. Gould; Gould & Lincoln
 Andrew F. Graves, Cornhill
 Benjamin H. Greene
 Oliver C. Greenleaf, Court St.
 William H. Halliday & Co., Cornhill
 Mrs. Mary Hickey, High St.
 Hickling, Swan & Brewer, Washington St.; Thomas M. Brewer
 Henry Hoyt
 Lemuel N. Ide, Washington St.
 John P. Jewett, Cornhill
 David P. King, Washington St.
 Charles Lauriat
 Joshua Lincoln; Gould & Lincoln
 Little, Brown & Co.; Augustus Flagg
 Littlefield's, Cornhill
 James Loring, Cornhill, Washington Street
 Josiah Loring, South Row
 Bela Marsh
 Hugh McDonnell, Washington St.
 George M. Merriam, Newbury (Washington) St.
 Israel Moody, Washington St.
 B. B. Mussey, Cornhill
 Munroe & Francis; Edmund Munroe, David Francis; Court St., Cornhill
 Sam F. Nichols; Nichols & Hall
 Old Corner Bookstore, Washington & School St.
 James R. Osgood & Co., Washington St.; E. Libby.
 James A.G. Otis, Washington St.
 Samuel H. Parker
 Elizabeth Palmer Peabody; West Street Bookstore
 Oliver L. Perkins, Cornhill
 James M. Piper
 William J. Reynolds & Co., Cornhill
 Benjamin B. Russell, Washington St.
 Francis S. Saxton, State St.
 Schoenhof & Moeller; Carl Schoenhof, Fanny Moeller
 Nathaniel S. Simpkins, Brattle St.
 George A. Snow; Snow, Boyden & Knight
 C.C. Soule
 William V. Spencer
 Charles Stimpson, Washington St.
 Strong & Brodhead, Cornhill
 Swedenborgian Book Store, Tremont St.
 Tappan & Whittemore, Washington St.
 Joseph Teal, Hanover St.
 William P. Tewksbury, Washington St.
 Ticknor and Fields
 John B. Tileston; Brewer & Tileston
 Abel Tompkins, Cornhill
 John Turner
 William Veazie
 John X. Watson
 Thomas Wells, Hanover St.
 Wells & Lilly; William Wells and Robert Lilly, Court St.
 Henry White
 Rev. Thomas Whittemore, Cornhill
 John K. Wiggin; Wiggin & Lunt

20th century
 J.Q. Adams & Co.
 Avenue Victor Hugo, Newbury St.
 E.E. Babb & Co.
 Walter H. Baker & Co.
 N.J. Bartlett & Co.
 C.E. Beale
 F.W. Bird
 Boston Book Co.
 John A. Boyle & Co.
 Buddenbrooks
 Burnham's Antique Book Store; Richard C. Lichtenstein
 William A. Butterfield
 H.M. Caldwell Co.
 H.H. Carter & Co.
 Theo. H. Castor & Co.
 W.B. Clarke Co.
 William G. Colesworthy
 C. James Connelly
 H.M. Connor
 Curtis & Cameron
 Cupples & Schoenhof
 DeWolfe & Fiske Co.
 Eaton & Mains
 Dana Estes & Co.
 Thomas J. Flynn
 Patrick Kevin Foley (a.k.a. P.K. Foley), Beacon St.
 Four Seas Company, Copley Sq.
 Garden Side Book Shop, Boylston St.
 Ginn & Co.
 Globe Corner Bookstore
 Goodspeed's Book Shop
 J.L. Hammett Co.
 Mrs. H.L. Hastings
 D.C. Heath & Co.
 F.C. Herrick, Copley Sq.
 Home Library and Supply Assoc.
 Houghton & Dutton
 Houghton, Mifflin & Co., Park St.
 George W. Humphrey
 Jordan Marsh
 Keep's Book Store, Columbus Ave.
 E.L. Kellogg & Co.
 Knight & Millet, Columbus Ave.
 C.A. Koehler & Co.
 Lauriat's, Washington St.
 A.A. Lewis, Hanover St.
 C.F. Libbie
 Little, Brown and Company
 George E. Littlefield, Cornhill
 Lee Lothrop & Shepherd
 A.D. Maclachlan
 Bertha Mahony
 Mutual Book Co., Franklin St.
 A.J. Ochs Co.; Boston Neck Book Store, Washington St.
 Old Corner Book Store, Bromfield St.
 Pitts-Kimball Co.
 George H. Polley, Court St.
 John A. Ryan, Brattle St.
 Smith & McCance, Bromfield St.
 South End Book Store, Washington St.
 Waterstone's
 R.H. White & Co.
 Women's Educational and Industrial Union; Bookshop for Boys and Girls

21st century

 Ars Libri, Harrison Ave.
 Barnes & Noble
 F. A. Bernett Books
 Border's
 Boston Book Company
 Brattle Book Shop, West St.
 Bromer Booksellers, Boylston St.
 Buddenbrooks, Newbury Street
 Commonwealth Books
 James F. O'Neil
 Lucy Parsons Center, Columbus Ave.
 Peter L. Stern & Co.
 Trident Booksellers, Newbury St.

See also
 Books in the United States
 Early American publishers and printers
 Bibliography of early American publishers and printers
 List of early American publishers and printers

Sources

17th-century
 Isaiah Thomas. History of printing in America, 2nd ed. 1874.
  Google books
 George Emery Littlefield. The early Massachusetts press, 1638-1711. Boston: Club of Odd Volumes, 1907.
 Worthington Chauncey Ford. The Boston book market, 1679-1700. Boston: Club of Odd Volumes, 1917.

18th-century
 Boston Directory. 1789.
 Isaiah Thomas. History of printing in America, 2nd ed. 1874.
 Henry Knox - Bookseller. Proceedings of the Massachusetts Historical Society, Third Series, Vol. 61. June 1928, p. 227+

19th-century
 Boston Directory. 1823.
 Boston Directory. 1849.
 Boston Directory. 1858.
 Boston Directory. 1868.
 Sargent. Lauriat's, 1872-1922: being a sketch of early Boston booksellers. 1922.

20th-century
 James Clegg. International directory of booksellers and bibliophile's manual. 1906.

References

External links

 Library Thing. Boston listings
 

Booksellers
Booksellers
 
Boston
 Booksellers
Booksellers
Booksellers